Little West Pond is a  pond in the West Plymouth section of Plymouth, Massachusetts. The pond is located northeast of, and is connected by a stream to, Big West Pond, west of Micajah Pond and Micajah Heights, and north of Kings Pond.

External links
Environmental Protection Agency

Ponds of Plymouth, Massachusetts
Ponds of Massachusetts